New Cumberland Lock and Dam is the fourth lock and dam on the Ohio River, located 54 miles downstream of Pittsburgh.  There are two locks, one for commercial barge traffic that's 1,200 feet long by 110 feet wide, and the recreational auxiliary lock is 600 feet long by 110 feet wide.  New Cumberland locks averages about 320 commercial lock throughs every month and  120 lock throughs a month on the recreational auxiliary lock.

See also
 List of locks and dams of the Ohio River
 List of locks and dams of the Upper Mississippi River

References

External links
U.S. Army Corps of Engineers, Pittsburgh District
U.S. Army Corps of Engineers, Huntington District
U.S. Army Corps of Engineers, Louisville District

Dams on the Ohio River
Dams in Ohio
Dams in West Virginia
Locks of West Virginia
Locks of Ohio
Dams completed in 1961